Kaituna River may refer to the following in New Zealand:

Kaituna River, river in the Bay of Plenty
Kaituna River (Canterbury), river on Banks Peninsula
Kaituna River (Marlborough), river in Marlborough
Kaituna River (Tasman), river in Tasman District